Portal Knights is an independent survival action role-playing video game developed by Keen Games and published by 505 Games. It was first released on Steam on 18 May 2017 and subsequently released for PlayStation 4, Xbox One, Nintendo Switch, Android, and iOS.

History 
Portal Knights was first announced by publisher 505 Games on 4 February 2016. It was released into Steam Early Access on 25 February 2016.

The game left Early Access on 18 May 2017 and was also released for PlayStation 4 and Xbox One on the same day. It was later released on the Nintendo Switch eShop on 23 November 2017, and then through retail on 13 February 2018.

The game's first mobile release took place on 6 December 2017, when it was released for both Android and iOS.

In January 2019, the game was  featured as one of the free PlayStation 4 games for PlayStation Plus subscribers.

Gameplay
Portal Knights combines exploration and building elements with role-playing aspects. It provides a multiplayer sandbox environment, in which players can explore, fight monsters and build.

The player can craft items such as pickaxes, swords and tools to smash blocks, fight monsters, and construct elaborate buildings, armour and weapons. It shares many similarities with the game Minecraft, both graphically and with the crafting and construction element. The art style of the game was inspired by JRPG games such as the Legend of Zelda series.

The game can be played both alone and with friends, supporting online play with up to 4 players simultaneously in the same world.

Reception

Portal Knights received "mixed or average" reviews for Microsoft Windows, PlayStation 4, and Nintendo Switch, and "generally favorable" reviews for Xbox One.

David Keremes of Nintendo World Report praised the title's vibrant worlds, accessible RPG mechanics, amount of content, and multiplayer, while criticizing the constant item management and unexplained crafting mechanics. Ryan Craddock of Nintendo Life lauded the pleasing art style, crafting options, and cooperative play while taking minor issue with finicky controls and long load times exclusive to the Switch port. Brandon Marlow of Push Square praised Portal Knights' crafting mechanics, combat, and boss battles but deemed the stats system and reliance on RNG as the game's hindrances.

Awards 
In December 2016, Deutscher Entwicklerpreis Awards 2016 selected Portal Knights as their choice for "Best Online Game 2016". The game was also nominated for Deutscher Entwicklerpreis' "Best Game Design", "Best Technical Achievement" and "Best German Game".

In December 2017, Portal Knights received the "Game of the Week" award from TouchArcade.

References

2017 video games
505 Games games
Android (operating system) games
Early access video games
IOS games
Indie video games
Multiplayer and single-player video games
Nintendo Switch games
Open-world video games
PlayStation 4 games
Role-playing video games
Video games developed in Germany
Windows games
Xbox One games